Battelle Riverfront Park is a  park in downtown Columbus, Ohio, United States, near Columbus City Hall. The park was established in 1983. It is named after Gordon Battelle and was funded by the Battelle Memorial Institute.

Features
The park features the James W. Barney Pickaweekee Story Grove (moved from a nearby children's park) amid several monuments and memorials, including the Columbus Firefighters Memorial (1958), Spanish–American War Memorial (1937), Their Spirits Circle the Earth (1987), and To Honor the Immigrants (1992). Alfred Tibor's sculpture Freedom (1985) is also installed in the park.

Several of the park's monuments and memorials were moved here from the Harry E. Richter Workers Memorial Park in 2016. That park, built in 2000, held a memorial originally placed in Franklin Park in 1992. The Richter Workers Memorial Park was replaced in 2016 with the Michael B. Coleman Government Center, which opened two years later.

The Santa Maria Ship & Museum, a replica of Christopher Columbus's Santa María, was docked on the Scioto River by the park beginning in 1991, as part of the city's 1992 Christopher Columbus Quincentennial Jubilee, celebrating the 500th anniversary of Columbus's voyage to the Americas. The ship's presence was aimed to draw people to the Columbus riverfront, though it had limited success, and attendance dropped over the years. The nonprofit tourist organization that operated it closed in 2011, and the Columbus Recreation and Parks Department inherited it. $5-6 million was estimated for its repairs, and with the extensive renovation of the Scioto's riverfront, the ship had to be relocated. It was removed in 2014, and remains in a city-owned lot in the South Side, in ten pieces. Environmental Protection Agency rules no longer permit it back on the Scioto River, and nobody has expressed interest in restoring the ship given the expense.

Gallery

See also

 List of parks in Columbus, Ohio

References

External links

 
 Scioto Mile page

1983 establishments in Ohio
Broad Street (Columbus, Ohio)
Downtown Columbus, Ohio
Parks in Columbus, Ohio
Protected areas established in 1983